Leonida is a given name and a surname which may refer to:

 Leonida Bagration of Mukhrani (1914-2010), wife of Vladimir Kirillovich, Grand Duke of Russia, a pretender to the Russian throne
 Leonida Barboni (1909–1970), Italian film cinematographer
 Leonida Bissolati (1857–1920), Italian socialist politician
 Leonida Kasaya (born 1993), Kenyan volleyball player
 Leonida Lari (1949–2011), Romanian poet, journalist, and politician from the Republic of Moldova
 Leonida Lucchetta (born 1911), Italian former footballer
 Leonida Pallotta (born 1910), Italian former football goalkeeper
 Leonida Rèpaci (1898–1985), Italian writer and political activist
 Leonida Tonelli (1885–1946), Italian mathematician
 Leonida Țurcan (1894-?), Bessarabian politician
 Ellen Leonida (born 1970), American criminal defense attorney
 Florica Leonida (born 1987), Romanian retired artistic gymnast
 Dimitrie Leonida (1883-1965), Romanian engineer
 Gheorghe Leonida (1892 or 1893-1942), Romanian sculptor
 Elisa Leonida Zamfirescu (1887-1973), Romanian engineer

See also
Leonidas (disambiguation)

Romanian-language surnames